Einion ab Anarawd  (1130–1163) was the son of Anarawd ap Gruffydd.

Early life 
Einion was born around 1130 AD in Carmarthenshire, Wales. He was Christened of the tribe Rhys ap Tewdwr. His mother is Margred ferch Cadwaladr.

Adulthood 

Rhys ap Gruffydd was the uncle of Einion. Einion aided King Henry II of England in 1158 in taking and destroying all the castles of Caredigion, gaining much in spoils of war. He was the captain of the king's bodyguard and the leader of the procession that raided the castles.

Einion was the father of Anarawd ab Einion (abt. 1150-1198), Madog ab Einion (abt. 1150 - 1193), and Hywel ab Einion (abt. 1150-1193).

Death 

Einion was killed in 1163 by orders of Roger de Clare, 2nd Earl of Hertford. He was killed by one of his servants while sleeping. His murderer was Walter de Clifford.

Notes

Bibliography 

 
 

 
 
 
 
 
 
 
 
 
 

1130 births
1160s deaths
Year of birth uncertain
Year of death uncertain
People from Carmarthenshire
Welsh people of Irish descent